The First Lady (Spanish: Primera dama) or (Deseos de mujer) is a Colombian telenovela produced by Henry Toto Duquem for Caracol Televisión. It is an adaptation of the Chilean telenovela of the same name.

The series stars Christian Meier as Leonardo Santander, Carina Cruz as Paloma Zamudio and Javier Jattin as Mariano Zamora.

Plot summary 
Paloma is a humble young woman who has a dream that must be fulfilled no matter the consequences: becoming the First Lady of Colombia. But in order to achieve this, she must leave aside the love she feels for Mariano, win the future president Leonardo Santander and, most important, win the trust of his wife, who unknowingly will open the doors of her house to the woman who will end her marriage, completely destroying the life of her family and  make her husband become President, so Paloma becomes the First Lady.

Cast

Main 
 Christian Meier as Leonardo Santander
 Carina Cruz as Paloma Zamudio de Santander
 Javier Jattin as Mariano Zamora

Secondary 
 Kathy Sáenz as Ana Milena San Juan
 Paula Barreto as Luciana "Lucy" Cuadra
 Jacqueline Arenal as Estrella Soto
 María Luisa Flórez as Paula Méndez 
 Juan David Agudelo as Diego Santander San Juan
 Natalia Jérez as Cristina Santander San Juan
 Caleb Casas as Aníbal Urrutia
 Greeicy Rendón as Daniela Astudillo
 Emerson Rodríguez as Amaury Bello
 Jairo Camargo as Adolfo Fernández
 Alejandra Ávila as Sandra Burr
 Mijail Mulkay as Federico "Fede" Astudillo
 José Luis García as Ángel Astudillo

Rating

References

External links 
 

Colombian telenovelas
2011 Colombian television series debuts
Caracol Televisión telenovelas
2011 telenovelas
2012 Colombian television series endings
Spanish-language telenovelas
Television shows set in Colombia